Pseudoacontias is genus of skinks, lizards in the family Scincidae.

Geographic range
The genus Pseudoacontias is endemic to Madagascar.

Description
All species of Pseudoacontias are large, fossorial skinks, measuring at least  in snout–vent length. They lack limbs or have greatly reduced limbs.

Species
The genus contains the following species:
Pseudoacontias angelorum 
Pseudoacontias madagascariensis  – giant Madagascar skink
Pseudoacontias menamainty 
Pseudoacontias unicolor

Etymology
The specific name, angelorum (genitive, masculine, plural), is in honor of twin brothers Angelien and Angeluc Razafimanantsoa who are Madagascan naturalists.

References

Further reading
Bocage JVB (1889). "Mélanges erpétologiques. I.—Sur un Scincoidien nouveau de Madagascar ". Jornal de Sciencias Mathematicas, Physicas e Naturaes, Academia Real das Sciencias de Lisboa, Segunda Série 1: 125–126. (Pseudoacontias, new genus, p. 125; P. madagascariensis, new species, pp. 125–126). (in French).

Reptiles of Madagascar
Endemic fauna of Madagascar
Lizard genera
Pseudoacontias
Taxa named by José Vicente Barbosa du Bocage